Denver is the central city of a conurbation region in the U.S. state of Colorado.  The conurbation includes one continuous region consisting of the six central counties of Adams, Arapahoe, Broomfield, Denver, Douglas, and Jefferson.  The Denver region is part of the Front Range Urban Corridor.

The United States Office of Management and Budget has delineated the Denver–Aurora–Lakewood, CO Metropolitan Statistical Area consisting of ten Colorado counties:  the City and County of Denver, Arapahoe County, Jefferson County, Adams County, Douglas County, the City and County of Broomfield, Elbert County, Park County, Clear Creek County, and Gilpin County. The population, as of the 2020 Census, is 2,963,821, an increase of 16.5% since 2010.

The Office of Management and Budget also delineated the more extensive 12-county Denver–Aurora, CO Combined Statistical Area comprising the Denver-Aurora-Lakewood Metropolitan Statistical Area,  the Boulder, CO Metropolitan Statistical Area, and the Greeley, CO Metropolitan Statistical Area.

The central part of the metropolitan statistical area (MSA) includes Denver and three immediately adjacent counties: Jefferson County to the west, Adams County to the north and east, and Arapahoe County to the south and east. The continuously urbanized area extends northwest into the City and County of Broomfield, bordering Jefferson and Adams counties, and south into Douglas County, adjoining Arapahoe County. Also included in the federally defined MSA are four rural counties: Elbert County on the southeastern prairie and Clear Creek, Gilpin, and Park counties in the Rocky Mountains.

Counties
The Denver-Aurora-Lakewood Metropolitan Statistical Area comprises ten counties.  The sortable table below includes the following information:
The official name of the county,
The county population as of April 1, 2020, as enumerated by the 2020 United States census
The county population as of April 1, 2010, as enumerated by the 2010 United States Census,
The percent population change from April 1, 2010, to July 1, 2017.

Metropolitan area cities and towns

Places with over 100,000 inhabitants

Arvada
Aurora
Centennial
Denver (Principal city)
Highlands Ranch (CDP)
Lakewood
Thornton
Westminster

Places with 10,000 to 100,000 inhabitants

Berkley (CDP)
Brighton
Broomfield
Castle Pines
Castle Rock
Columbine (CDP)
Commerce City
Englewood
Federal Heights
Golden
Greenwood Village
Ken Caryl (CDP)
Littleton
Lone Tree
Northglenn
Parker
Sherrelwood (CDP)
The Pinery (CDP)
Welby (CDP)
Wheat Ridge

Places with fewer than 10,000 inhabitants

Acres Green (CDP)
Applewood (CDP)
Alma
Aspen Park (CDP)
Bailey 
Black Hawk
Byers (CDP)
Carriage Club (CDP)
Pines (CDP)
Central City
Cherry Hills Village
Coal Creek
Columbine Valley
Cottonwood (CDP)
Deer Trail
Derby (CDP)
Downieville-Lawson-Dumont
East Pleasant View (CDP)
Edgewater
Elizabeth
Empire
Evergreen (CDP)
Fairplay
Foxfield
Franktown (CDP)
Genesee (CDP)
Georgetown
Glendale
Grand View Estates (CDP)
Heritage Hills (CDP)
Idaho Springs
Indian Hills (CDP)
Kiowa
Kittredge (CDP)
Lakeside
Larkspur
Lochbuie
Louviers (CDP)
Meridian (CDP)
Montbello (CDP)
Morrison
Mountain View
North Washington (CDP)
Perry Park (CDP)
Ponderosa Park (CDP)
Roxborough Park (CDP)
Sedalia (CDP)
Sheridan
Silver Plume
Simla
St. Mary's
Stonegate (CDP)
Strasburg (CDP)
Todd Creek (CDP)
Twin Lakes (CDP)
Westcreek (CDP)
West Pleasant View (CDP)

Communities previously part of the Denver metro area

Former Denver metro communities now part of the separate Boulder metropolitan area due to being located in Boulder County
Boulder
Longmont
Lafayette
Louisville
Superior

Former Denver metro communities now part of the separate Greeley metropolitan area due to being located in Southwestern Weld County
 Dacono
 Firestone
 Fort Lupton
 Frederick

Regional cooperation
The Denver Regional Council of Governments (DRCOG, pronounced Doctor Cog) is a regional planning and inter-governmental coordination organization in a nine-county region. The Scientific and Cultural Facilities District (SCFD) provides funding for scientific and cultural facilities in a seven-county region including:
The Denver Museum of Nature and Science
The Denver Zoo
The Denver Art Museum
The Denver Center for the Performing Arts
The Denver Botanic Gardens
In addition, the Regional Transportation District (RTD) provides mass transit, including a light rail system. In 2005 the RTD developed a twelve-year comprehensive plan, called "FasTracks", to build and operate rail transit lines and expand and improve bus service throughout the region.

Economy
The most prosperous parts of the area are in the south and the northwest, while the most industrialized areas are in the northeast, specifically in the northern part of Denver proper and extending to areas such as Commerce City in Adams County.

Changes in house prices for the area are publicly tracked on a regular basis using the Case–Shiller index; the statistic is published by Standard & Poor's and is also a component of S&P's 10-city composite index of the value of the residential real estate market. The Denver MSA is also home to one of the fastest growing tech scenes outside of Silicon Valley in the country.

Electricity is provided by Xcel Energy. Cable television is provided by Comcast.

Sports

The following table shows sports teams in the Denver metropolitan area that average more than 12,000 fans per game:

Air quality
The center of the metropolitan area sits in a valley, the Denver Basin, and suffers from air pollution known colloquially as the brown cloud, building up if the air is stagnant as it often is in the winter. Severity of pollution in this area has varied enormously over the years. In the late 1980s the area was frequently in violation of multiple National Ambient Air Quality Standards established by the United States Environmental Protection Agency (EPA). The Regional Air Quality Council (RAQC) was formed in 1989 to create plans to address the problem. Through a variety of measures the area's air quality was improved and in 2002 the EPA designated the area in compliance with all federal health-based air quality standards. Denver was the first major city in the United States to reach compliance with all six of these standards after previously violating five of them.  Since then the EPA introduced a new standard for small particulates and made the existing ozone standard stricter. In 2003 the new ozone standard was frequently exceeded in the area and was occasionally exceeded as far away as Rocky Mountain National Park. The RAQC hopes to implement plans enabling the area to comply with the new standards by 2007.

Sister cities
Though Aurora, Boulder, Brighton, Broomfield, Denver, Lakewood, and Longmont have their own individual sister city relationships, the Denver Regional Council of Governments (DRCOG) as a whole has a sister city relationship with the Baghdad Governorate of Iraq.

See also

Colorado
Outline of Colorado
Index of Colorado-related articles
List of places in Colorado
List of cities and towns in Colorado
List of census-designated places in Colorado
List of counties in Colorado
Colorado statistical areas
Front Range Urban Corridor
North Central Colorado Urban Area
Denver–Aurora, CO Combined Statistical Area

References

External links

Denver Regional Council of Governments
International Migration
Regional Air Quality Council
Regional Transportation District
Science & Cultural Facilities District
United States Census Bureau
U.S. population estimates

 
Geography of Denver
Metropolitan areas of Colorado
Geography of Aurora, Colorado